Bokakhat Assembly constituency is one of the 126 assembly constituencies of Assam Legislative Assembly. Bokakhat forms part of the Kaliabor Lok Sabha constituency.

Town Details

Following are details on Bokakhat Assembly constituency-

Country: India.
 State: Assam.
 District: Golaghat district  .
 Lok Sabha Constituency:  Kaliabor Lok Sabha/Parliamentary constituency..
 Assembly Categorisation: Rural
 Literacy Level:  91.27%.
 Eligible Electors as per 2021 General Elections: 1,47,487  Eligible Electors. Male Electors:73,798 . Female Electors: 73,686 .
 Geographic Co-Ordinates: 26°44'54.2"N 93°50'06.7"E.
 Total Area Covered: 1307 square kilometres.
 Area Includes:   Bokakhat thana; Mahura mouza in Golaghat thana; and Rangamati mouza in Dergaon thana in Golaghat sub-division, of Golaghat district of Assam.
 Inter State Border : Golaghat.
 Number Of Polling Stations: Year 2011-166,Year 2016-166,Year 2021-93.

Members of Legislative Assembly

Following is the list of past members representing Bokakhat Assembly constituency in Assam Legislature.

 1962: Narendranath Sarma, Indian National Congress.
 1967: L. Das, Indian National Congress.
 1972: Tulsi Das, Indian National Congress.
 1978: Chatra Gopal Karmakar, Indian National Congress.
 1983: Dharmeshwar Hazarika, Indian National Congress.
 1985: Balobhadra Tamuly, Independent.
 1991: Bhupendra Nath Bhuyan, Indian National Congress.
 1996: Bhupendra Nath Bhuyan, Indian National Congress.
 2001: Jiten Gogoi, Independent.
 2006: Jiten Gogoi, Independent.
 2011: Arun Phukan, Indian National Congress.
 2016: Atul Bora, Asom Gana Parishad.
 2021: Atul Bora, Asom Gana Parishad.

Election results

2021 result

2016 results

References

External links 
 

Assembly constituencies of Assam
Golaghat district